Osvaldo Salvador Escudero (born October 15, 1960 in Paso de los Libres, Corrientes) is a former Argentine professional footballer. He was part of the Argentina Under-20 team that won the 1979 FIFA World Youth Championship in Japan.

Escudero started his career with Chacarita Juniors in 1978, he also played for Boca Juniors where he won the Metropolitano 1981 and at Rosario Central where he won the 1986–1987 championship. He played abroad for Barcelona SC (Ecuador) and Mitsubishi Motors (Japan).

His other clubs include Vélez Sársfield, Unión de Santa Fe, Independiente, Racing Club, Platense and Chaco For Ever.

His younger brother Sergio Escudero is also football player.

The Story of a champion

With 12 different teams in his 16-year career as a professional footballer, Pichi Escudero was the beginning of his career in 1978, when 17 Aprils behind debuted with the first team of Chacarita Juniors in his native Argentina.

Escudero good participation in this campaign helped him be summoned to the FIFA U-20 World Cup and Argentina national under-20 football team albiceleste, that it would be world champion that played in Japan in 1979, with the help of Diego Armando Maradona and Ramon Diaz category.

"We were very young (with Maradona), where we hardly had the illusion of success in first. Diego always had very good appreciation for me, we were very good friends. On the court always interpreted the game well and movements Diego, he also mine and did a very good duo. Also with Ramon Diaz (scorer of the tournament). We got along all three, "said Escudero, recalling the exploits with the Argentina youth.

After a short time in Vélez and return to Chacarita Juniors, recently it took to Boca Juniors will set eyes on the young striker. In the Boca Juniors team he returned to share dressing room with Maradona, who Escudero described as the greatest player he saw in his life.

Subsequently, their experiences Independiente de Avellaneda, Rosario Central and Racing Club, helped to "Pichi" out of Argentina to go on loan in 1991 to Barcelona from Ecuador, where he was champion after six months in which he participated.

After passing the Japanese football, he retired with Tiger. And as exfutbolista two kindergartens and a personal business in his country gave a comfortable and peaceful life Escudero. It gave him enough to get on with life, leaving aside the professional football until Jaime appeared "the Chelona" Jaime Rodríguez, who sought his advice for tryout in ADFAS.

"I never thought to be technical. Never. I came to El Salvador and Jaime is a close friend of Guillermo Figueroa (official of) Santa Tecla and he was joking if I would lead Santa Tecla. Jokingly he said yes too. I had no vocation to be technical, because I did not like being technical. Communicate always cost me. I was always very quiet and a technician must talk much, convey their ideas, "Escudero confessed, saying that something that helped him develop the talent strategist was the fact of directing veteran teams in Argentina".

In the same way, Escudero admits that despite fogueando go in the league veterans adjust to the technical direction of Santa Tecla was not easy. Today makes a contrast of the first tournament (Apertura 2012) that came with the tournament that has now led. Expresses feel more confident and solvency to convey ideas to his players in a better way.

The first stage ended with Santa Tecla, according to his opinion, not by the fact of making a bad role, but because "he was not comfortable with my assistant Guillermo Rivera. It was not faithful to me and the board gave him the right (trust) to it and if so is because they did not trust me", said Escudero.

Today, with its second phase with Santa Tecla, besides being the first coach to steer in first division, it has become the first coach who gave the team a title of the hills. The challenge is now bigger. CONCACAF Champions League on the horizon.

Escudero is very clear and is aware of the inferiority against teams with higher return and better foreigners. However, leaving an image worthy of national football, but especially yours, it is the main objective.

Coaching career Club
From June 2012, Escudero was the new coach of the Santa Tecla of First Division of El Salvador.

October 31, 2012, left the Santa Tecla by problems with Guillermo Rivera (former Salvadoran selected), but returned for the title of the Clausura 2015 tournament champion.

Active football statistics

Career statistics

Clubs

Footballer honours

Managerial stats

Clubs

Honours football coach

International football player selection

Footballer honours

References

External links

 http://www.laprensagrafica.com/2015/05/24/el-santa-tecla-campeon-del-clausura-2015
 http://www.laprensagrafica.com/2015/05/25/y-no-queria-ser-dt
 Osvaldo Escudero at BDFA.com.ar 
 
 

1960 births
Living people
People from Paso de los Libres
Argentine footballers
Argentine expatriate footballers
Chacarita Juniors footballers
Club Atlético Vélez Sarsfield footballers
Boca Juniors footballers
Unión de Santa Fe footballers
Club Atlético Independiente footballers
Rosario Central footballers
Racing Club de Avellaneda footballers
Barcelona S.C. footballers
Club Atlético Platense footballers
Urawa Red Diamonds players
Expatriate footballers in Ecuador
Expatriate footballers in Japan
Argentine Primera División players
Japan Soccer League players
J1 League players
Argentina youth international footballers
Argentina under-20 international footballers
Argentine expatriate sportspeople in Ecuador
Argentine expatriate sportspeople in Japan
Association football forwards
Sportspeople from Corrientes Province